Matthew Edward Diaz (born March 3, 1978) is an American former professional baseball outfielder. He played in Major League Baseball for the Tampa Bay Devil Rays, Kansas City Royals, Atlanta Braves, Pittsburgh Pirates and Miami Marlins.

Amateur career
As a two-year starter at Florida State University, Diaz helped lead the Seminoles to two College World Series appearances, including the  title game vs. the University of Miami.

Professional career

Tampa Bay Devil Rays
He was drafted by the Tampa Bay Devil Rays in the 1999 Major League Baseball Draft in the 17th round.

Despite being among the Devil Rays' minor league career leaders in hits and extra base hits, Diaz had a tough time in the majors, hitting only .167 in 30 at-bats in his two years with the Devil Rays.

Kansas City Royals

Atlanta Braves
On December 19, 2005, Diaz was traded to the Atlanta Braves for minor league pitcher Ricardo Rodríguez. Diaz earned a backup outfielder spot for the Braves during spring training. Appearing in 124 games, including many starting assignments in the second half of the season, Diaz batted .327 in 297 at-bats. On August 14, 2006, Diaz had four hits for the second straight day and tied the National League record with ten straight hits. He grounded out in the 9th inning to end the streak.

Diaz had his first career two-homer game on August 29, against the Florida Marlins. On September 5, he hit a three-run walk-off double in the bottom of the ninth to give the Braves a 9-8 win. Diaz finished the season with a career-high .338 batting average in 124 games.

Pittsburgh Pirates

In December 2010, Diaz agreed to a two-year, $4.25 million contract with the Pittsburgh Pirates.

Second stint with the Atlanta Braves
On August 31, 2011, Diaz was traded back to the Braves for a player to be named later.  Pittsburgh also sent cash to the Braves in the deal.  On August 13, 2012, the Braves announced that Diaz would have surgery on his thumb and would miss the rest of the 2012 season.

New York Yankees
On December 26, 2012, Diaz signed a minor-league contract with the New York Yankees with an invitation to Spring Training.  He was released on March 17, 2013.

Miami Marlins
Diaz was brought up by the Miami Marlins from their Triple-A affiliate New Orleans Zephyrs on May 2, 2013.

Retirement
On Feb. 4th, 2014 Matt Diaz announced his retirement from professional baseball. On April 24, 2014 Diaz joined the Braves pre-game and postgame telecast of Braves Live on Fox Sports South, which he will do regularly for the 2014 season. Diaz also does work for MLB Network Radio.

Personal life
A born-again Christian, Diaz and his wife Leslee have three kids, Nathan Everett, Anna Grace, and Matthew Jacob. Matt is the second oldest of four brothers:  Zachary, contemporary Christian singer Jonny Diaz, and Benjamin. His surname has an Anglicized pronunciation which originated with his grandfather who had emigrated from Barcelona. He grew up in Lakeland, Florida.

Quotes
 On not being an everyday player: "[A] lot of people would think about the money they're not making if they don't play every day, but we all make enough money."

Matt Diaz is the center of a viral video of him getting heckled by a New York Mets fan.  He was heckled for wearing two different socks, and Diaz responded by showing the fans behind him the variation in color.

References

External links

1978 births
Living people
Tampa Bay Devil Rays players
Kansas City Royals players
Atlanta Braves players
Pittsburgh Pirates players
Miami Marlins players
Arizona League Royals players
Baseball players from Portland, Oregon
Bakersfield Blaze players
Durham Bulls players
Florida State Seminoles baseball players
Gwinnett Braves players
Hudson Valley Renegades players
Major League Baseball left fielders
Mississippi Braves players
Omaha Royals players
Orlando Rays players
Sportspeople from Lakeland, Florida
Baseball players from St. Petersburg, Florida
Richmond Braves players
Baseball players from Atlanta
Baseball players from Tampa, Florida
St. Petersburg Devil Rays players
Wichita Wranglers players
New Orleans Zephyrs players
American people of Spanish descent